Coca-Cola India is a subsidiary of The Coca-Cola Company and operates in India.

Background 
The Coca-Cola Company started operating in India in 1950. However, in 1977, they withdrew operations from the country in protest of regulations and legislation by the Government of India limiting the dilution of equity of multinational corporations. On October 24, 1993, they decided to re-enter the market, and have maintained a strong presence ever since.

Sustainability 
The company supports sustainable development and inclusive growth by focusing on issues relating to water, environment, healthy living, empowerment of women, sanitation and social advancement.

Coca-Cola India launched the 5by20 initiative in 2010, which is the company’s global program to economically empower 5 million women entrepreneurs across six industries by 2020.

Coca-Cola India and NDTV launched the Support My School initiative in association with the UN-Habitat, Charities Aid Foundation (CAF) in 2011. It undertakes activities such as providing improved access to water, sanitation facilities for adolescents, improving school infrastructure, supporting environmental causes, building sports and recreational facilities, and recharging groundwater through rainwater harvesting in government schools in rural and semi-urban areas across India.

Controversy

Centre for Science and Environment 
Coca Cola sales in India declined 11% in the third quarter of 2003 due to allegations by the Delhi-based Centre for Science and Environment (CSE), which said the top 12 soft drink brands of PepsiCo and Coca-Cola contained pesticides and insecticides in excess of the limits set by the European Economic Commission (EEC).

Plachimada plant 

Coca-Cola had set up a factory in the tribal village of Plachimada in Kerala in 1999. The factory extracted huge quantities of groundwater for its production. The groundwater level receded and was found to be contaminated by the factory's operations, giving rise to health issues among the residents of the village. The company sold the slurry and sludge waste as fertilizer to locals, primarily engaged in farming, which was later found to contain dangerous levels of toxic metals in a study conducted by University of Exeter. Coca-Cola India executives, however, claimed that the fertilizer was "good for crops", and they had scientific evidence proving its safety.  Eventually, locals mobilized under the banner 'Coca-Cola Virudha Janakeeya Samara Samithy' (Anti Coca-Cola Peoples Struggle Committee) and demanded that the factory be closed and farmers be compensated. The company initiated legal action against the protestors, which resulted in intimidation, arrests and false case being filed against the protestors. They received support from neighbouring villages, environmentalists, politicians, scientists, and several civil society organizations. The plant was forced to stop production in March 2004. The cause of the farmers became international with a BBC investigatory report and later in 2007 when college students in the United States ran a nationwide campaign calling for a boycott of Coca-Cola. After a prolonged legal battle in Kerala High Court and then the Supreme Court, Coca-Cola relinquished its license in July 2017 and stated that it would not resume production in the plant.

References

External links
 

Drink companies of India
Coca-Cola
Indian subsidiaries of foreign companies
Indian companies established in 1950
Manufacturing companies based in Gurgaon